Woolley is a village and civil parish in the City of Wakefield in West Yorkshire, England. It had a population of 575 in 2001, which increased to 1,339 at the 2011 Census.

History 
Historically Woolley, mentioned as "Weludai" in the Domesday Book, was part of the Staincross Wapentake in the West Riding of Yorkshire. In the late 19th century it was part of the Roystone parish. Until 1974 it formed part of the rural district of Wakefield.

Geography 
No major roads pass through the village.

West of the village is the escarpment known as Woolley Edge, which has given its name to the nearby Woolley Edge service station on the M1 motorway.

Also 2 miles (3 km) to the south west is Woolley Colliery village that straddles the boundary between West and South Yorkshire counties.

See also
Listed buildings in Woolley, West Yorkshire
Woolley Hall

References

External links

Villages in West Yorkshire
Civil parishes in West Yorkshire
Geography of the City of Wakefield